The Palestrina Mosaic or Nile mosaic of Palestrina is a late Hellenistic floor mosaic depicting the Nile in its passage from the Blue Nile to the Mediterranean. The mosaic was part of a Classical sanctuary-grotto in Palestrina, a town east of Ancient Rome, in central Italy. It has a width of 5.85 metres and a height of 4.31 metres and provides a glimpse into the Roman fascination with ancient Egyptian exoticism in the 1st century BC, both as an early manifestation of the role of Egypt in the Roman imagination and an example of the genre of "Nilotic landscape", with a long iconographic history in Egypt and the Aegean.

Description

The mosaic, with an arch-headed framing that identifies its original location as flooring an apse in a grotto, features detailed depictions of Ptolemaic Greeks, Aethiopians in hunting scenes, and various animals of the Nile river. It is the earliest Roman depiction of Nilotic scenes, of which several more were uncovered at Pompeii. A consensus on the dating of the work is slowly emerging. Paul G. P. Meyboom suggests a date shortly before the reign of Sulla (ca. 100 BC) and treats the mosaic as an early evidence for the spread of Egyptian cults in Italy, where Isis was syncretised with Fortuna. He believes Nilotic scenes were introduced in Rome by Demetrius the Topographer, a Greek artist from Ptolemaic Egypt active ca. 165 BC. Claire Préaux emphasises the "escapist" nature of the fantastic scenery.

History

Origins
The Nile Mosaic and its companion piece, the Fish Mosaic, were apparently still to be seen in the Italian city of Palestrina, ancient Praeneste, in the 15th century. When first noticed shortly before 1507 by Antonio Volsco, a humanist in the circle of Pomponio Leto, the mosaics were still in situ among the vestiges of Sulla's sanctuary of Fortuna Primigenia. At that time the town was owned by the Colonna family of Rome, whose palazzo in Palestrina occupied a section of the ruins.

The mosaic may have been indicated in a well-known passage in Pliny's Natural History concerning mosaic floors in Italy:

Volsco added that these were "arranged in the pattern of a picture". Maurizio Calvesi, in identifying Francesco Colonna as the author of Hypnerotomachia Poliphili, identifies passages in Hypnerotomachia depending on Pliny that were enriched by direct experience of the mosaics themselves.

17th century
In the 17th century, Palestrina passed to the Barberini family, who between 1624 and 1626 removed most of the mosaic from its setting, without recording the overall composition, and, after further movements and damage, put it on exhibition in the Palazzo Barberini in Palestrina, where it remains. The mosaic was restored and repaired on numerous occasions, but careful watercolors of the sections were made for Cassiano dal Pozzo before the initial restoration in the opificio of St. Peter's. Helen Whitehouse's rediscovery of the long-lost watercolors enabled a reconstruction of the surviving segments in a more meaningful way  although much remains uncertain about the original composition. The mosaic has been a major feature of the Museo Nazionale Prenestino in the Palazzo Barberini in Palestrina since 1953.

References

Sources

Finley, The Light of the Past, 1965, p. 93.
C. Roemer, R. Matthews, Ancient Perspectives on Egypt, Routledge Cavendish 2003, pp. 194ff.
Paul G. P. Meyboom, The Nile Mosaic of Palestrina: Early Evidence of Egyptian Religion in Italy, Leiden:Brill 1995, pp. 80ff

Roman mosaics
Nile
Hellenistic art
Ptolemaic Kingdom
Marine art
Animals in art
Antikensammlung Berlin
Archaeological discoveries in Italy
Ships in art